Porcupine Plain Airport  is located  north of Porcupine Plain, Saskatchewan, Canada.

See also 
 List of airports in Saskatchewan

References

External links
Page about this airport on COPA's Places to Fly airport directory

Registered aerodromes in Saskatchewan
Porcupine No. 395, Saskatchewan